In linear algebra, a branch of mathematics, a k-frame is an ordered set of k linearly independent vectors in a vector space; thus k ≤ n, where n is the dimension of the space, and if k = n an n-frame is precisely an ordered basis.

If the vectors are orthogonal, or orthonormal, the frame is called an orthogonal frame, or orthonormal frame, respectively.

Properties 
 The set of k-frames (particularly the set of orthonormal k-frames) in a given space X is known as the Stiefel manifold, and denoted Vk(X).
 A k-frame defines a parallelotope (a generalized parallelepiped); the volume can be computed via the Gram determinant.

See also 
 Frame (linear algebra)
 Frame of a vector space

Riemannian geometry 
 Orthonormal frame 
 Moving frame

Linear algebra